Al-Amin (born 5 October 1993) is a Bangladeshi first-class cricketer who plays for Barisal Division. He was a member of Bangladesh's under-19 cricket team for the 2012 Under-19 Cricket World Cup.

He was the leading run-scorer for Prime Bank Cricket Club in the 2017–18 Dhaka Premier Division Cricket League, with 495 runs in 11 matches. In October 2018, he was named in the squad for the Khulna Titans team, following the draft for the 2018–19 Bangladesh Premier League. He was the leading run-scorer for Barisal Division in the 2018–19 National Cricket League, with 260 runs in five matches.

See also
 List of Barisal Division cricketers

References

External links
 

1993 births
Living people
Bangladeshi cricketers
Abahani Limited cricketers
Barisal Division cricketers
Dhaka Metropolis cricketers
Rangpur Riders cricketers
Khulna Tigers cricketers
Prime Bank Cricket Club cricketers
Place of birth missing (living people)